Pat DiNizio/Buddy Holly is the fourth solo album by Pat DiNizio of The Smithereens, released in 2009 by Koch Records. The album features DiNizio interpreting eleven songs from the Buddy Holly songbook. The string arrangements, performed by the Encore Chamber String Quartet, were created by Charles Calello, famed for his work with The Four Seasons, Neil Diamond, Barbra Streisand, Bruce Springsteen and Laura Nyro. The album also features 1960s teen idol Bobby Vee on vocals and production by long-time Smithereens collaborator Kurt Reil of The Grip Weeds. The album's liner notes include an essay by noted Buddy Holly authority Bill Griggs along with reminiscences by Bobby Vee.

Background

Inspired by The Beatles’ use of strings on "Eleanor Rigby" and "Yesterday", DiNizio chose to include string arrangements on most of the songs on the album. "We didn't take the material and do wacky things with it just to be different," DiNizio said. "I went to someone who was alive and making records when Buddy was still alive – Charles Calello – to arrange all of the strings." DiNizio said of the album: "I wanted to honor the memory of the musical artist from whom I got the most inspiration from – and in fact, provided the necessary encouragement to want to be a songwriter.  I felt that on the fiftieth anniversary of his passing that someone should say something, but I didn’t want to do a typical knock-off Buddy Holly album, so I took a more baroque string-driven direction.  On virtually every track there is a string quartet.  So, it honors his memory, but I make the songs my own."

Critical reception

AllMusic's Mark Deming rated the album 4 stars out of 5, saying that "DiNizio has opened up an unexpected side of the songs on Pat DiNizio/Buddy Holly that's strikingly effective", noting that "the concise, dramatic tone of the arrangements lends them a mature tone that dovetails remarkably well with Holly's lyrics and melodies". Deming added that much of the album "suggests how Holly might possibly have tackled these songs if he'd lived long enough to still perform them at age 55 or 60". Dave Tianen of the Milwaukee Journal Sentinel wrote that the use of strings on most of the songs make them sound "a little fuller, a little darker and at times a bit baroque". He felt that it "freshens" the music without violating Holly's original vision. He added that "Dinizio has done something here that probably sounds a little weird but works". In a more critical review Gene Triplett of The Oklahoman said that although DiNizio's voice was well-suited for the songs, and the acoustic and electric guitars "drive things swimmingly along for the most part", he felt that "such meant-to-be-snappy tunes as "Everyday" and "Peggy Sue" are inexplicably slowed to a maddeningly sluggish midtempo crawl, a gosh-awful doo-wop a cappella treatment of "That’ll Be the Day" cries out for guitar, and all of the songs are overladen with syrupy chamber strings, seriously marring DiNizio's well-intentioned salute to Holly".

Track listing

Personnel

Credits adapted from the album's liner notes.

Musicians
Pat DiNizio – vocals, acoustic guitar 
Kurt Reil – drums, harmonica, vocals, guitar, 6-string bass
Charles Calello – string arrangements
John DiPuccio – 1st violin
Laszlo Pap – 2nd violin
Katrenna Johnson – viola  
Barbara Corcillo – cello
Bobby Vee – harmony and lead vocals on "Listen to Me"  
Kristin Pinel – lead guitar on "Raining in My Heart"
Tommy Frangione – guitar on "Raining in My Heart"
Frank Iovino – a cappella vocals (bass) on "That'll Be the Day" 
Tony Alexander – a cappella vocals (baritone) on "That'll Be the Day" 
Spanky Pionegro – a cappella vocals (2nd tenor) on "That'll Be the Day"
Dino Pionegro – a cappella vocals (1st tenor) on "That'll Be the Day"  
Technical
Kurt Reil – production, engineering, mixing, liner notes 
Zach Ziskin – engineering (Spectrum Studios)
Arnold Mischkulnig – mastering 
Paul Grosso – creative direction, art direction, design
Alice Butts – art direction, design
Michael Halsband – photography
Bill Griggs – liner notes
Bobby Vee – liner notes

Notes
Recorded at House of Vibes, Highland Park, New Jersey
String Quartet and acapella vocals recorded at Spectrum Studios, Pompano Beach, Florida
Bobby Vee vocals recorded at Rockhouse Studios, St. Joseph, Minnesota 
Mastered at Chop Shop Studios, Brooklyn, New York

References

2009 albums
Buddy Holly tribute albums
Covers albums
E1 Music albums